The year 1579 in science and technology included a number of events, some of which are listed here.

Exploration
 June 17 – Francis Drake, during his circumnavigation of the world, lands in what is now California, which he claims for Queen Elizabeth I of England as Nova Albion.

Physiology and medicine
 Hieronymus Fabricius discovers the membranous folds that serve as valves in the veins.

Births
 January 12 (bapt.) – Jan Baptist van Helmont, Flemish chemist (died 1644)
 July 13 – Arthur Dee, English physician and alchemist (died 1651)

Deaths
 June 17 – Johannes Stadius, Flemish mathematician and astronomer (born c. 1527)
 approx. date – Hans Staden, German adventurer (born c. 1525)

References

 
16th century in science
1570s in science